A list of animated television series first aired in 1972.

See also
 List of animated feature films of 1972
 List of Japanese animation television series of 1972

References

Television series
Animated series
1972
1972
1972-related lists